Pa Takht-e Do (also Romanized as Pā Takht-e Do, meaning "Pa Takht 2") is a village in Kakasharaf Rural District, in the Central District of Khorramabad County, Lorestan Province, Iran. At the 2006 census, its population was 59, in 9 families.

References 

Towns and villages in Khorramabad County